William Joseph Higgins (13 May 1898 – 18 February 1969) was an Irish hurler. At club level he played with Cobh and Collins and was also a member of the Cork senior hurling team.

Career

Higgins first played hurling with Cobh before later lining out with the Collins club in Cork. He first appeared on the inter-county scene as a member of the Cork junior hurling team that won the Munster JHC in 1925. Higgins missed the delayed All-Ireland series of games as his performances earned an immediate call-up to the senior team. His debut season was a successful one as Cork made a clean sweep of National League, Munster Championship and All-Ireland titles. Higgins won a second successive provincial title the following year, however, Cork were later beaten by Dublin in the 1927 All-Ireland final.

Death

Higgins died on 18 February 1969, aged 70.

Honours

Cork
All-Ireland Senior Hurling Championship: 1926
Munster Senior Hurling Championship: 1926, 1927
National Hurling League: 1925–26
Munster Junior Hurling Championship: 1925

References

1898 births
1969 deaths
Collins hurlers
Cobh hurlers
Cork inter-county hurlers
All-Ireland Senior Hurling Championship winners